The 1930 United States Senate election in Montana took place on November 4, 1930. Incumbent United States Senator Thomas J. Walsh, who was first elected to the Senate in 1912, and re-elected in 1918 and 1924, ran for re-election. He won the Democratic primary unopposed, and faced Montana Supreme Court Associate Justice Albert J. Galen, the Republican nominee, and several independent opponents in the general election. Ultimately, Walsh defeated his opponents in a landslide and won his fourth and final term in the Senate.

Democratic primary

Candidates
Thomas J. Walsh, incumbent United States Senator

Results

Republican primary

Candidates
Albert J. Galen, Associate Justice of the Montana Supreme Court, former Attorney General of Montana
O. H. P. Shelley

Results

General election

Results

See also 
 United States Senate elections, 1930 and 1931

References

Montana
1930
1930 Montana elections